2014 census may refer to:

Alberta municipal censuses, 2014
Crimean Federal District Census (2014)
2014 Moldovan Census
2014 Moroccan census